Mario Pomposi (born 25 February 1902, date of death unknown) was an Italian racing cyclist. He rode in the 1929 Tour de France.

References

1902 births
Year of death missing
Italian male cyclists
Place of birth missing